Nipuna Kariyawasam (born 30 August 1991) is a Sri Lankan cricketer. He made his first-class debut for Moors Sports Club in the 2012–13 Premier Trophy on 1 February 2013. In April 2018, he was named in Kandy's squad for the 2018 Super Provincial One Day Tournament.

References

External links
 

1991 births
Living people
Sri Lankan cricketers
Colts Cricket Club cricketers
Kalutara Town Club cricketers
Moors Sports Club cricketers
Place of birth missing (living people)